= Imperialist (band) =

American metal band

Imperialist is an American black metal band. They have released three albums, all on Transcending Obscurity Records.

== Discography ==
- Quantum Annexation (EP, 2015)
- Cipher (2018)
- Zenith (2021)
- Quantum (EP, 2023)
- Prime (2025)

== External link ==
- Discogs

=== Further reading ===
- Review of Cipher by Angry Metal Guy
- Review of Zenith by Angry Metal Guy
- Review of Zenith by Metal Roos
- Review of Zenith by Stormbringer.at (in German)
- Review of Zenith by The Dark Melody (in Spanish)
- Review by Quantum by Ghost Cult Mag
- Review of Prime by Metal Temple
- Review of Prime by Angry Metal Guy
- Review of Prime by Metal Epidemic
- Review of Prime by Obliveon (in German)
- Review of Prime by Metal Eclipse Reviews
